Always Trouble with the Reverend is a 1972 West German comedy film directed by Harald Vock and starring Georg Thomalla, Peter Weck and Chris Roberts. It is a sequel to the 1971 film The Reverend Turns a Blind Eye.

Like the previous film it was shot around Lake Wörthersee in Carinthia.

Cast
 Georg Thomalla as Pfarrer Himmelreich
 Peter Weck as Thomas Springer
 Chris Roberts as Rainer Kurzmann
 Heidi Hansen as Beate Bessen
 Theo Lingen as Bischof
 Otto Schenk as Oskar
 Eddi Arent as Punchen
 Heinz Reincke as Alfred
 Carlos Werner
 Ossy Kolmann
 Kurt Nachmann as Kalweit
 Eva Garden as Mascha Weber
 Guido Wieland as Bürgermeister
 Erich Padalewski
 Gretl Löwinger
 Norbert Kammil

References

Bibliography 
 Hans-Michael Bock and Tim Bergfelder. The Concise Cinegraph: An Encyclopedia of German Cinema. Berghahn Books, 2009.

External links 
 

1972 films
1972 comedy films
German comedy films
West German films
1970s German-language films
Films directed by Harald Vock
Films scored by Gerhard Heinz
Gloria Film films
Films about Catholic priests
1970s German films